The 35th Arkansas Infantry (1862–1865) was a Confederate Army infantry regiment during the American Civil War. Having gone through multiple prior reorganizations, it had previously been known as the 17th (Griffiths) Arkansas Infantry Regiment, the 35th Arkansas, and the 22nd Arkansas.

Organization
35th Arkansas Infantry Regiment was organized during the summer of 1862 and later redesignated as the 22nd Arkansas Infantry Regiment.  It was organized from remnants of the 17th (Griffiths) Arkansas Infantry Regiment and former Militia members who enlisted in the summer of 1862.  It was also known as the 1st (Rector's War Regiment) Arkansas Infantry. The unit was placed in Fagan's and A. T. Hawthorne's Brigade, Trans-Mississippi Department.  Its commanding officers were Colonels Frank Rector, James P. King and Henry J. McCord, Lieutenant Colonel John W. Wallace, and Majors John J. Dillard and Mark T. Tatum.

Service
Under the command of Colonel James P. King, the 35th Arkansas fought at the Battle of Bayou Fourche and the Battle of Helena where it reported 75 casualties. Later, under the command of Colonel Henry J. McCord, the unit saw action at the Battle of Jenkins' Ferry.

See also

 List of Arkansas Civil War Confederate units
 Lists of American Civil War Regiments by State
 Confederate Units by State
 Arkansas in the American Civil War
 Arkansas Militia in the Civil War

References

External links
 Edward G. Gerdes Civil War Home Page
 The Encyclopedia of Arkansas History and Culture
 The War of the Rebellion: a Compilation of the Official Records of the Union and Confederate Armies
 The Arkansas History Commission, State Archives, Civil War in Arkansas
 

Units and formations of the Confederate States Army from Arkansas
1865 disestablishments in Arkansas
Military units and formations disestablished in 1865
Military units and formations in Arkansas
Military in Arkansas
1862 establishments in Arkansas
Military units and formations established in 1862